Connor Freff Cochran (also mononymously Freff) is an author, correspondent, and publisher as a founder of Conlan Press.

Career
In 1984, Cochran was a US-based correspondent for BBC2's TV series Micro Live (credited as "Freff"), reporting on telephony and computing in the United States.  By 1993 and through at least 2000, Cochran wrote opinion pieces in a series called Creative Options; entrants were published in Keyboard magazine and the bulletin of the Multidisciplinary Association for Psychedelic Studies.  By 2016, Cochran's self-published bio at Conlan Press also listed him as "an award-winning writer, artist, musician, producer, and performer […] comic book writer-artist […] and a graduate of the Ringling Brothers and Barnum & Bailey Clown College".

Peter S. Beagle
By 2011, Cochran was the publisher for Peter S. Beagle, author of the 1968 novel The Last Unicorn.  Cochran himself was featured on the audio commentary for The Last Unicorn Blu-ray, noted for "repeatedly plugging of a Last Unicorn comic".  In early 2016, Cochran was listed as a publisher and executive editor for Conlan Press, a publishing house he founded that described itself as "launched in 2005 as a way to help author Peter S. Beagle".

On June 21, 2019, Judge Michael M. Markman of the Alameda County Superior Court found in favor of Beagle, awarding attorneys' fees plus  for "financial elder abuse, fraud, breach of fiduciary duty, and defamation." In his decision, Markham said of Cochran, "[he] presents as an extremely intelligent, articular, overly-aggressive hustler and pitch-man. Cochran's written work product attempting to promote Beagle's work is written as Cochran speaks – with a flair for the dramatic that is at best loosely based in truth." On March 23, 2021, Beagle regained from Cochran the intellectual property rights to his works.

Despite discharging his debts to Beagle via bankruptcy, Cochran appealed his sentence "as a means of disputing Beagle's claims of financial elder abuse, fraud, breach of fiduciary duty, and defamation."  In December 2021, a California Court of Appeal did not rule on the matter, dismissing his appeal as moot.

Published works

References

External links
 

20th-century non-fiction writers
20th-century publishers (people)
21st-century publishers (people)
foreign correspondents